Anderson Luis da Silva (born 22 December 1972), known as Anderson Silva or Anderson Batatais, is a Brazilian football coach and former player who played as a central defender.

Club statistics

References

External links

1972 births
Living people
Campeonato Brasileiro Série A managers
Brazilian footballers
Brazilian football managers
Expatriate footballers in Japan
J1 League players
J2 League players
Brazilian expatriate footballers
Paulista Futebol Clube players
Albirex Niigata players
Clube Atlético Sorocaba players
Coritiba Foot Ball Club players
Associação Atlética Ponte Preta players
Ceará Sporting Club managers
Mirassol Futebol Clube managers
FC Atlético Cearense managers
Ferroviário Atlético Clube (CE) managers
Association football defenders
People from Batatais